Cartosat-2B is an Earth observation satellite in a Sun-synchronous orbit and the fourth of the Cartosat series of satellites. The satellite is the seventeenth satellite in the Indian Remote Sensing (IRS) satellite series to be built by the Indian Space Research Organisation (ISRO).

Instrument 
The satellite carries a panchromatic camera (PAN) capable of taking black-and-white pictures in the visible region of electromagnetic spectrum. The highly agile Cartosat-2B can be steered up to 26° along as well as across the direction of its movement to facilitate imaging of any area more frequently. Very-high-resolution land imagery.

Launch 
It was launched along with the 116 kg Algerian satellite Alsat-2A, one nanosatellite each from Canada (AISSat-1) and Switzerland (TIsat-1), and STUDSAT-1, an Indian picosatellite, on 12 July 2010, at 03:52 UTC in a Polar Satellite Launch Vehicle (PSLV-C15) launch vehicle from the spaceport at Sriharikota.

See also 

 List of Indian satellites

References 

Spacecraft launched in 2010
Spacecraft launched by PSLV rockets
Cartosat